"Gloria" is a 1979 love song written and composed in Italian by Umberto Tozzi and Giancarlo Bigazzi, and afterwards translated to English by Jonathan King. A 1982 cover version by American singer Laura Branigan peaked at number two on the US Billboard Hot 100 and has been certified platinum by the Recording Industry Association of America (RIAA).

Umberto Tozzi version

Background
Umberto Tozzi first recorded "Gloria" in 1979. The song stayed four weeks at number one in both Switzerland and—in a translated version—Spain. That same year, Tozzi's "Gloria" reached number four in Austria, number five in Belgium, number eight in West Germany and number 29 in the Netherlands.

"Gloria" is a love song, as is the first English rendering of the song, recorded by its original English-language lyricist, Jonathan King, in November 1979, reaching number 65 on the UK Singles Chart. Tozzi later recorded and performed King's translated version of "Gloria". He also re-recorded the song with Trevor Veitch's and Laura Branigan's English lyrics; this version appears on his 2002 album The Best of Umberto Tozzi.

In 2011, the song was brought up to date with a set of new house mixes by Alex Gaudino and Jason Rooney. The music video stars Umberto and Natasha Tozzi.

Tozzi's original version of "Gloria" appeared on the respective soundtracks to the 2013 films The Wolf of Wall Street and Gloria. It was also played during the Parade of Nations in the 2019 Summer Universiade Opening Ceremony as Italy, the host nation of the Universiade at the time, entered the stage.

Lyrical content
In Jonathan King's English lyrics, Tozzi, who takes the role of the song's main character, tells that he is dreaming about an imaginary woman named Gloria. He describes his living days as misery, but when he dreams of Gloria, he says his nights are liberty. The protagonist describes Gloria as his queen imagination that comes from his fascination, not from any kind of fantasy. He further elaborates that he has always set Gloria free from him, just as he has set freedom from reality. He then tells that his friends think he is crazy, but he argues his point that they have never met Gloria (so far, he has no proof of her actual existence); but one day when he finds her, he says his friends will talk about Gloria's beauty and her loyalty. To accomplish the goal of realizing his dreams despite everyone else's protests, the protagonist sets all his life to search for Gloria until he meets her in reality, and then promises to hold her, to touch her, and to keep her because he loves Gloria.

Track listings

Personnel
 Umberto Tozzi – vocals, chorus
 Greg Mathieson – conductor, piano, keyboards
 Barry Morgan – drums
 Mats Björklund – guitar
 Les Hurdle – bass
 Filarmonica Di Monaco – strings
 Euro Cristiani – chorus

Charts

Weekly charts

Year-end charts

Certifications

Laura Branigan version

Background
Atlantic Records' managing director Doug Morris suggested that Laura Branigan work with producer Jack White, who suggested that she record an English version of Tozzi's hit "Gloria". Branigan recalled that on hearing the Tozzi track, "We gave it the American kick and rewrote the lyrics and off she went." Branigan's remake of "Gloria" was produced by White and co-produced by Greg Mathieson, who had been the arranger of, and the keyboardist on Tozzi's original song, while also being the primary keyboardist on the Branigan album.

Branigan told People magazine that she and her producers had at first attempted an English version of Tozzi's "Gloria" in the romantic mode of the original, changing the title to "Mario", but that it seemed ineffective. Ultimately, Branigan recorded an English re-invention of "Gloria" as a character study of, in her words, "a girl that's running too fast for her own steps," the cover lyrics of which were written by Trevor Veitch, the contractor for the Branigan album, to which he also contributed guitar work; Branigan also did her part in co-writing of the cover song's lyrics.

In 2003, Branigan characterized "Gloria" as "Certainly my signature song. And I always get the same reaction wherever I go, and whenever I perform it ... I have to end every show with that song, and people just go crazy."

Branigan later released a hi-NRG re-recording of the song just a few months before her death. "Gloria 2004" was released with several remixes on 26 April 2004.

Commercial performance
"Gloria" attained its highest profile via a re-working featured on the 1982 album Branigan, the first released album by Branigan. Although another selection, "All Night with Me", was chosen as the album's lead single, Branigan also performed the cover song during her promotional television appearances at the time of the album's release, and the track was chosen as the album's second single in June 1982, first becoming a disco favorite, and gradually accruing radio support to enter the pop charts in July. The single reached number two on the Billboard Hot 100 on 27 November 1982, behind Lionel Richie's "Truly", and remained there the following two weeks, through 11 December—when Richie had been supplanted by Toni Basil's "Mickey".

"Gloria" earned Branigan a nomination for the Best Pop Vocal Performance Female Grammy Award for the year 1982. The song remained in the Top 40 for 22 weeks, and its total Hot 100 residency of 36 weeks established a new record for a single by a solo female act. The song also topped Cash Box magazine's chart. Certified platinum for sales of one million in the United States alone, "Gloria" was also an international success, most notably in Australia where it held the top position for seven consecutive weeks, from 7 February to 21 March 1983. "Gloria" also reached number one in Canada, number four in Ireland, number six in New Zealand and the United Kingdom, and number nine in South Africa.

Notable inclusions
Branigan's cover of "Gloria" appeared in the musical drama Flashdance in 1983, though it was not included in the film's soundtrack. In a nod to her hit, Branigan's rendition of "Santa Claus Is Coming to Town" performed on the Solid Gold Christmas special featured the background vocalists singing the name "Gloria", evoking both Branigan's signature song and the Latin refrain of the Christmas carol "Angels We Have Heard on High".

Branigan's "Gloria" is also used as the signature tune of the Alan Jones radio show.

The cover song was also incorporated into the score of Flashdance the Musical in a scene where the character named Gloria performs a pole dance routine; sung by Djalenja Scott and Carryl Thomas in Ruthie Stephens's 2008–09 national tour of the musical, and by Twinnie-Lee Moore and Hannah Levane in the 2010–11 play at West End theatre, where Charlotte Harwood assumed the role of Gloria.

The song appears in the 2015 video game Metal Gear Solid V: The Phantom Pain as a collectible cassette tape.

The song is featured on the Flash FM station playlist in the video game Grand Theft Auto: Vice City Stories.

In 2017, the first episode of the BBC/Netflix series White Gold began with the song.

Chilean screenwriter and director Sebastián Lelio utilized Tozzi's rendition of "Gloria" in the 2013 film Gloria; Lelio's 2019 English-language remake Gloria Bell features the title character (played by Julianne Moore) dancing to Branigan's take on the song in a sequence hailed as an essential highlight of the film.

In January 2021 the song was heard playing during Donald Trump's "Save America" rally, as captured in a video shared by Donald Trump Jr. The backstage video went viral after rally participants attacked the United States Capitol. Branigan's legacy manager Kathy Golik responded to the video, calling it "absolutely appalling to hear 'Gloria' being played in the background of a widely-circulating video of Pres. Trump [...] given the tragic, unsettling, & shameful happenings that occurred at the US Capitol."

Use by the St. Louis Blues
The National Hockey League's (NHL) St. Louis Blues began using Branigan's cover version of "Gloria" as its unofficial victory song when they went on a franchise-record 11-game winning streak during the 2018–19 season. The origins of "Gloria"'s association with the Blues came from when a few Blues players visited a bar in South Philadelphia called Jacks NYB to watch the "Double Doink" NFL Wild Card game between the Philadelphia Eagles and Chicago Bears.

After a victory over the Philadelphia Flyers, which came after a disappointing season, the Blues played "Gloria" in the locker room to celebrate their victory, with it then becoming a regular locker room ritual. When their stadium's DJ learned of it, he began playing the song in the stadium to rally the team. The song was played at Enterprise Center every time the Blues won a game in the 2018-2019 season, leading to "Play Gloria!" becoming both a meme and victory chant for Blues fans. Local radio station Y98 played the song for 24 hours following the Blues' Game 7 victory over the Dallas Stars in May 2019, and again after beating the Boston Bruins in the Stanley Cup Finals. The bands Phish and Vampire Weekend, who were both holding concerts in St. Louis on the night of Game 7, performed covers of "Gloria" when they learned the Blues had won the Cup.

Branigan's legacy manager Kathy Golik embraced the trend, with Branigan's verified Twitter page frequently posting support for the Blues, especially during their 2019 playoff run. Branigan's official website was also updated with a new splash page which expressed support for the Blues and proclaimed Branigan as the "Original Play Gloria". Golik stayed in St. Louis and attended every game and watch party during the Blues' 2019 Stanley Cup run while discussing the trend with media outlets. When fans of the Boston Bruins, the Blues' opponent in the 2019 Stanley Cup Finals, started re-purposing the "Play Gloria" meme, it earned a rebuke from Branigan's Twitter page which went viral. Custom-made Blues jerseys with Branigan's name and the number 82 surged in popularity during the 2019 Stanley Cup playoffs, with one being displayed on Branigan's Twitter page, along with other Blues merchandise sent by fans. "Gloria" reappeared on the iTunes singles chart thanks to the trend, reaching number three after the Blues won the Stanley Cup. "Gloria" would also re-enter the Billboard charts in the wake of the Blues' championship, landing at number 46 on the Digital Song Sales chart for the week of 22 June 2019. Golik noted that streams of "Gloria" surged across all platforms and this had a "trickle down" effect to the rest of Branigan's catalog, with her other singles such as "Self Control", "Solitare", and "How Am I Supposed to Live Without You" seeing significant upticks in streams and downloads during the 2019 Stanley Cup Playoffs.

The song's resurgence in popularity led to Branigan's management receiving numerous requests for live performances and public appearances, leading them to release a statement reminding the public that Branigan is deceased, as well as adding a note about this to her social media accounts. Forbes described "Gloria" as an "unlikely championship anthem" and noted that the Blues' Stanley Cup victory could permanently alter the meaning and legacy of the song, with it becoming forever associated with the St. Louis Blues and ice hockey in general. Golik also stated her belief that Branigan and "Gloria" "will forever be intertwined" with the Blues and the city of St. Louis. When asked how she thought Branigan would have reacted to the "Play Gloria" meme had she lived to see it, Golik said, "She was very sincere, very down to Earth, she would just have been very touched by it all. If she were here, I know she would have participated in a very big way. I know she's there in spirit. To see them win and to hear that song blaring and coming up in the arena and looking around and seeing people singing out as loud as they can, cheering and having a good time, it's indescribable what that's like."

Track listings

Personnel

 Laura Branigan – vocals
 Michael Boddicker – synthesizer
 Joe Chemay – background vocals
 Bob Glaub – bass guitar
 Jim Haas – background vocals
 Jon Joyce – background vocals
 Michael Landau – guitar
 Greg Mathieson – synthesizer, keyboards
 Lisa Sarna – background vocals
 Stephanie Spruill – background vocals
 Julia Tillman Waters – background vocals
 Carlos Vega – drums
 Trevor Veitch – guitar
 Maxine Willard Waters – background vocals

Charts

Weekly charts

Year-end charts

All-time charts

Certifications

Other versions and inclusions

Early years
English singer-songwriter Jonathan King released his version in 1979 which peaked at No. 65 on the UK Singles Chart.

A Czech rendition of "Gloria", titled "Dívka Gloria", was a local success for Vítězslav Vávra in 1980; as well as for the Estonian rendering of "Gloria" recorded by Mait Maltis in the same year. In 1982, Sheila released a French language version with lyrics by Claude Carrère and Jean Schmitt; the single, "Glori, Gloria" rose to number 8 in France on 15 January 1983. Also in 1982, Lena Valaitis had a single release of "Gloria" with new German lyrics written by Michael Kunze, and production by Jack White. In 1983, Carola Häggkvist recorded a Swedish rendering of "Gloria"—with lyrics by Ingela Forsman—for her album Främling, and Mona Carita recorded a Finnish version of the song for her album Mikä Fiilis!

"Gloria" has been used internationally in television commercials for products as diverse as beer and flour; while another version of the song, amended into an advertising jingle with lyrics to suit the product, and soundalike vocalist to Branigan, was used in an Australian TV commercial for the 1984 Mitsubishi Cordia.

Prior to the commercial success of Branigan's version in the United Kingdom, British singer Elkie Brooks recorded her version of "Gloria", which was unreleased prior to inclusion in the 1986 album The Very Best of Elkie Brooks. Australian singer Julie Anthony also recorded "Gloria" for her 1983 covers album What a Feeling.

Later years
Debbie Reynolds sings a snippet of "Gloria" in the "Lows in the Mid-Eighties" episode of the NBC sitcom Will & Grace (broadcast on 23 November 2000), performing the song as the character "Bobbi Adler" in a sequence set in 1985. Australian Young Divas included "Gloria" on their self-titled album in 2006.

David Civera recorded a Spanish rendering of "Gloria" for his album A ritmo de clasicos in 2011, the same year that Sergio Dalma recorded another Spanish version of "Gloria" on his album Via Dalma II; the album lasted five weeks at number 1 in Spain, and earned quadruple-platinum status. Airing in December 2011, Sergio Dalma also performed the song on an RTVE special called Via Dalma, where Tozzi was also among the guests. In 2012, Mexican singer Gloria Trevi recorded a version of the song and released it as the first single for her eponymous, Gloria Live album.

On 12 June 2019, while in St. Louis, Phish covered the song following the St. Louis Blues's win over the Boston Bruins in the 2019 Stanley Cup Finals. The Blues would play the song after every win in 2019. In 2021 Angel Olsen released a cover of the song on her EP Aisles.

See also

 Music of Italy

References

1979 songs
1979 singles
1982 singles
2004 singles
2011 singles
Atlantic Records singles
Cashbox number-one singles
CBS Records singles
Compagnia Generale del Disco singles
Hi-NRG songs
House music songs
Laura Branigan songs
Jonathan King songs
Number-one singles in Australia
Number-one singles in Spain
Number-one singles in Switzerland
Pop ballads
RPM Top Singles number-one singles
Songs written by Giancarlo Bigazzi
Songs written by Umberto Tozzi
St. Louis Blues
Umberto Tozzi songs